Simon Armstrong is a Welsh actor from Llanelli, best known for his portrayal of Qhorin Halfhand in Game of Thrones.

Career
Armstrong portrayed Qhorin Halfhand in the HBO series Game of Thrones (2012). He also had recurring roles in the TV series Coronation Street (2013) and The Interceptor (2015).

He portrayed Rogers in Nigel Cole's Made in Dagenham (2010). He starred in the Dutch crime action comedy Black Out (2012) and in the British drama film In the Dark Half (2012).

In 2014, Simon joined the cast of British-American short Artificio Conceal. The film, written and directed by Ayoub Qanir, was selected to film festivals worldwide including Cannes Film Festival's Short Film Corner , Edinburgh International Film Festival and Seattle International Film Festival.

Selected filmography

Film

Television

Selected theatre
 2017: Sir Toby Belch in Twelfth Night at the Royal Exchange, Manchester.

References

External links 
 

21st-century Welsh male actors
Living people
Welsh male television actors
Welsh male film actors
People from Llanelli
Year of birth missing (living people)